Laelia fracta  is a species of moth of the family Erebidae described by William Schaus and W. G. Clements in 1893.

Distribution
It is found in Burundi, Cameroon, the Democratic Republic of the Congo, Ghana, Kenya, Sierra Leone, South Africa and Tanzania.

References

Lymantriinae
Moths of Africa
Moths described in 1893